Ho-sung, also spelled Ho-seong, is a Korean masculine given name. The meaning differs based on the hanja used to write each syllable of the name. There are 49 hanja with the reading "ho" and 27 hanja with the reading "sung" on the South Korean government's official list of hanja which may be used in given names.

People with this name include:
Kim Ho-seong (born 1959), South Korean voice actor
Lee Ho-seong (baseball) (1967–2008), South Korean baseball player
Ho-Sung Pak (born 1967), South Korean-born American film actor and martial artist
Lee Ho-sung (fencer) (born 1968), South Korean fencer
Kim Sol (born Kim Ho-seong, 1973), South Korean writer
Choi Ho-sung (born 1973), South Korean golfer
Cho Ho-sung (born 1974), South Korean track cyclist
Lee Ho-sung (footballer) (born 1974), South Korean football forward

See also
List of Korean given names

References

Korean masculine given names